The Wiebbe Hayes Stone Fort on West Wallabi Island (also known as Wiebbe Hayes Island) is the oldest surviving European building in Australia and was built in 1629 by survivors of the  shipwreck and massacre.

History
Following the Batavia shipwreck in 1629, a group of the marooned soldiers under the command of Wiebbe Hayes were put ashore on West Wallabi Island to search for water. A group of mutineers who took control of the other survivors left Hayes' group there secretly hoping that they would starve or die of thirst. However the soldiers discovered that they were able to wade to East Wallabi Island, where there was a fresh water spring. Furthermore, West and East Wallabi Island are the only islands in the group upon which the tammar wallaby lives. Thus the soldiers had access to sources of both food and water that were unavailable to the mutineers. 

Later the mutineers mounted a series of attacks, which the soldiers repulsed. The remnants of improvised defensive walls and stone shelters built by Wiebbe Hayes and his men on West Wallabi Island are Australia's oldest known European structures, more than a century and a half before expeditions to the Australian continent by James Cook and Arthur Phillip. It is unimpressive and isolated and yet this simple structure, just some loose rocks piled up to make a simple fortress, is the first building Europeans constructed in Australia."

See also
List of the oldest buildings in the world

References

Further reading

 
 

1629 establishments in Australia
Military installations in Western Australia
Buildings and structures completed in 1629
Australian folklore
Batavia (1628 ship)
Maritime history of the Dutch East India Company
Buildings and structures associated with the Dutch East India Company
Forts in Australia